This is a list of the moths of subfamily Arctiinae that are found in Canada. It also acts as an index to the species articles and forms part of the full List of moths of Canada.

Following the species name, there is an abbreviation that indicates the Canadian provinces or territories in which the species can be found.

Western Canada
BC = British Columbia
AB = Alberta
SK = Saskatchewan
MB = Manitoba
YT = Yukon
NT = Northwest Territories
NU = Nunavut

Eastern Canada
ON = Ontario
QC = Quebec
NB = New Brunswick
NS = Nova Scotia
PE = Prince Edward Island
NF = Newfoundland
LB = Labrador

Tribe Arctiina
Acerbia alpina (Quensel, 1802) -YT, NT
Arctia brachyptera Troubridge & Lafontaine, 2000 -YT
Apantesis nais (Drury, 1773) -ON, QC, NS
Apantesis phalerata (Harris, 1841) -ON, QC
Arctia caja (Linnaeus, 1758) -BC, AB, SK, ON, QC, NB, NS, NF
Arctia opulenta (Edwards, 1881) -BC, MB, YT, NT
Estigmene acrea (Drury, 1773) -BC, AB, SK, MB, NT, ON, QC, NB, NS, PE, NF
Grammia anna (Grote, 1864) -ON
Grammia arge (Drury, 1773) -ON, QC
Grammia blakei (Grote, 1865) -AB, SK, MB, YT
Grammia celia (Saunders, 1863) -BC, AB, SK, MB, YT, NT, ON, QC, NS
Grammia complicata (Walker, 1865) -BC
Grammia doris (Boisduval, 1869) -BC, AB, SK, MB, ON, QC, NB, NS
Grammia elongata (Stretch, 1885) -BC, AB
Grammia figurata (Drury, 1773) -ON, QC
Grammia gibsoni (McDunnough, 1937) -AB, SK, MB
Grammia nevadensis (Grote & Robinson, 1866) -BC
Grammia obliterata (Stretch, 1885) -AB, SK, MB, NT
Grammia ornata (Packard, 1864) -BC
Grammia parthenice (Kirby, 1837) -BC, AB, SK, MB, ON, QC, NB, NS, NF
Grammia philipiana Ferguson, 1985 -YT
Grammia phyllira (Drury, 1773) -AB, SK, ON, QC
Grammia quenseli (Paykull, 1793) -BC, MB, YT, NT, QC, NF
Grammia superba (Stretch, 1873) -BC, AB, YT
Grammia virgo (Linnaeus, 1758) -BC, AB, SK, MB, ON, QC, NB, NS, PE, NF
Grammia virguncula (Kirby, 1837) -AB, SK, MB, YT, ON, QC, NB, NS, NF
Grammia williamsii (Dodge, 1871) -BC, AB, SK, MB, NT, ON, QC, NB
Holoarctia sordida (McDunnough, 1921) -BC, AB
Holomelina aurantiaca (Hübner, [1831]) -SK, MB, NT, ON, QC, NB, NS
Holomelina ferruginosa (Walker, 1854) -BC, AB, SK, MB, ON, QC, NB, NS
Holomelina fragilis (Strecker, 1878) -BC
Holomelina immaculata (Reakirt, 1864) -MB, ON, QC
Holomelina laeta (Guérin-Méneville, [1832]) -SK, MB, ON, QC, NB, NS
Holomelina lamae (Freeman, 1941) -AB, SK, MB, QC, NB, NS, PE
Holomelina opella (Grote, 1863) -ON, QC
Hypercompe permaculata (Packard, 1872) -BC, AB, SK
Hypercompe scribonia (Stoll, 1790) -ON
Hyphantria cunea (Drury, 1773) -BC, AB, SK, MB, ON, QC, NB, NS, PE, NF
Leptarctia californiae (Walker, 1855) -BC
Neoarctia beanii (Neumoegen, 1891) -BC, AB
Neoarctia brucei (Edwards, 1888) -BC
Pararctia lapponica (Thunberg, 1791) -YT, NT, NU, QC
Pararctia subnebulosa (Dyar, 1899) -YT
Pararctia yarrowii (Stretch, 1873) -BC, AB, YT, NT
Parasemia plantaginis (Linnaeus, 1758) -BC, AB, SK, MB, YT, NT, ON, QC
Phragmatobia assimilans Walker, 1855 -BC, AB, SK, MB, ON, QC, NB, NS
Phragmatobia fuliginosa (Linnaeus, 1758) -BC, AB, SK, MB, YT, NT, ON, QC, NB, NS, NF
Phragmatobia lineata Newman & Donahue, 1966 -AB, SK, ON
Platarctia parthenos (Harris, 1850) -BC, AB, SK, MB, YT, NT, ON, QC, NB, NS, NF
Platyprepia virginalis (Boisduval, 1852) -BC
Pyrrharctia isabella (Smith, 1797) -BC, AB, SK, ON, QC, NB, NS, PE, NF
Spilosoma congrua Walker, 1855 -BC, AB, SK, MB, ON, QC, NB, NS
Spilosoma danbyi (Neumoegen & Dyar, 1893) -BC, AB, MB
Spilosoma dubia (Walker, 1855) -AB, SK, MB, ON, QC, NB, NS, PE
Spilosoma latipennis Stretch, 1872 -ON, QC, NB
Spilosoma pteridis Edwards, 1874 -BC, AB, SK
Spilosoma vagans (Boisduval, 1852) -BC, AB
Spilosoma virginica (Fabricius, 1798) -BC, AB, SK, MB, ON, QC, NB, NS, PE, NF
Dodia albertae Dyar, 1901 -AB, SK, MB, YT, NT, QC
Dodia kononenkoi Tshistjakov & Lafontaine, 1984 -YT
Dodia verticalis Lafontaine & Troubridge, 2000 -YT
Haploa clymene (Brown, 1776) -ON, QC, NB
Haploa confusa (Lyman, 1887) -SK, MB, ON, QC, NB
Haploa contigua (Walker, 1855) -ON, QC
Haploa lecontei (Guérin-Méneville, 1832) -AB, SK, MB, ON, QC, NB, NS
Haploa reversa (Stretch, 1885) -ON
Tyria jacobaeae (Linnaeus, 1758) -BC, QC, NB, NS
Utetheisa bella (Linnaeus, 1758) -ON, QC, NS
Cisseps fulvicollis (Hübner, [1818]) -BC, AB, SK, MB, NT, ON, QC, NB, NS
Ctenucha virginica (Charpentier, 1830) -BC, AB, SK, MB, ON, QC, NS, PE, NF
Gnophaela vermiculata (Grote, 1864) -BC, AB, SK, MB
Cycnia oregonensis (Stretch, 1873) -BC, AB, SK, MB, ON, QC, NS
Cycnia tenera Hübner, 1818 -BC, AB, SK, MB, ON, QC, NB, NS
Euchaetes egle (Drury, 1773) -ON, QC
Halysidota harrisii Walsh, 1864 -ON
Halysidota tessellaris (Smith, 1797) -SK, MB, ON, QC, NB, NS, PE
Lophocampa argentata (Packard, 1864) -BC
Lophocampa caryae Harris, 1841 -ON, QC, NS
Lophocampa maculata Harris, 1841 -BC, AB, SK, MB, ON, QC, NB, NS, NF
Lophocampa roseata (Walker, 1866) -BC
Pygarctia spraguei (Grote, 1875) -MB

Tribe Lithosiini
Acsala anomala Benjamin, 1935 -YT, NT
Bruceia pulverina Neumoegen, 1893 -BC
Cisthene plumbea Stretch, 1885 -ON
Clemensia albata Packard, 1864 -BC, AB, SK, MB, ON, QC, NB, NS
Crambidia casta (Packard, 1869) -BC, AB, SK, YT, ON, QC, NS
Crambidia cephalica (Grotes & Robinson, 1870) -AB
Crambidia impura Barnes & McDunnough, 1913 -BC, AB, MB, YT
Crambidia pallida Packard, 1864 -MB, ON, QC, NB, NS
Crambidia pura Barnes & McDunnough, 1913 -ON
Eilema bicolor (Grote, 1864) -BC, AB, SK, MB, YT, NT, ON, QC, NB, NS, NF
Hypoprepia fucosa Hübner, [1831] -MB, ON, QC, NB, NS
Hypoprepia miniata (Kirby, 1837) -BC, AB, SK, MB, ON, QC, NS
Lycomorpha pholus (Drury, 1773) -AB, SK, ON, QC, NB, NS

External links
Moths of Canada at the Canadian Biodiversity Information Facility

Canada